Kosmos 670 ( meaning Cosmos 670) was an unmanned Soyuz 7K-S test. It used a new and unique inclination of 50.6 degree.  The experience from these flights were used in the development of the successor program Soyuz spacecraft the Soyuz 7K-ST.

Mission parameters
Spacecraft: 7K-S
Mass: 6700 kg
Crew: None
Launched: August 6, 1974 
Landed: August 8, 1974 23:59 UTC.
Perigee: 221 km
Apogee: 294 km
Inclination: 50.6 deg
Duration: 2.99 days

See also
Cosmos 772
Cosmos 869

References

Kosmos 0670
1974 in the Soviet Union
Spacecraft launched in 1974
Soyuz uncrewed test flights